The Macdonald Campus of McGill University (commonly referred to as the ‘Mac Campus’ or simply ’Mac’) houses McGill's Faculty of Agricultural and Environmental Sciences (FAES), which includes the Institute of Parasitology, the School of Human Nutrition and the McGill School of Environment. It is located in Sainte-Anne-de-Bellevue, Quebec, in the West Island region of the Island of Montreal. The property is also the home of John Abbott College.

History 

Construction began in 1905, and the school opened its doors to students in 1907 as the Macdonald College of McGill University. Planned and funded completely by Sir William Macdonald, who also provided a $2 million operating endowment, it was designed by architects Alexander Cowper Hutchison and George W. Wood.

James Wilson Robertson served as its first principal, and oversaw its construction and hired its first staff. Robertson eventually came into conflict with Macdonald and following budgetary restrictions in 1909, resigned from this position in 1910.

Several buildings on the downtown McGill campus were also funded by Sir William Macdonald and designed by the Montreal-based architect Andrew Taylor, including the Macdonald Physics Building (1893), Redpath Library (1893), Macdonald Engineering Building (1907), and the Strathcona Medical Building (1907)—since renamed the Strathcona Anatomy and Dentistry Building.

Far surpassing the Ontario Agricultural College, Macdonald College was the largest in Canada and in its day was one of the most modern agricultural colleges in the world. After two years of planning and construction, the college opened in the fall of 1907 under principal James Wilson Robertson.

In 1938, the Rural Adult Education Service of Macdonald College was established. In 1943, John W. McConnell purchased an adjacent  of farmland and donated it to the college, increasing the property's size to its current .

In 1965, it became the Macdonald Campus of McGill University. Students studying at Macdonald Campus can earn internationally recognized degrees at both the undergraduate - B.Sc.(Agr) -  and graduate level in the fields of agriculture, food, natural sciences, applied economics, environment, and engineering.

In 1971, McGill leased a portion of the Macdonald Campus to the newly created John Abbott College, vacating many historic buildings for the CEGEP. This coincided with McGill's decision to move the Faculty of Education to the downtown campus. In 2002, this portion of the campus was permanently sold to John Abbott College.

On September 26, 2006, Canada Post issued a special commemorative stamp in honour of the 100th anniversary of the founding of the college.

Programs 
The Faculty of Agricultural and Environmental Sciences (FAES) and the School of Human Nutrition are located on McGill University's Macdonald Campus. The campus comprises 650 hectares in a waterfront setting on the western tip of the island of Montreal.

The faculty offers:
 Certificate in Ecological Agriculture  
 Bachelor of Science in Agriculture; Bachelor of Agricultural and Environmental Sciences in Agricultural Science with option in International Agriculture; Bachelor of Science Agriculture Science in Agricultural Science with option in Ecological Agriculture

The faculty offers a variety of degree programs at the undergraduate level leading to a B.Sc. degree in either Agricultural and Environmental Sciences (AgEnvSc), Food Science (FoodSc) or Nutritional Sciences (NutrSci), or a B.Eng degree in Bioresource Engineering (BREE). In addition, M.Sc., M.Sc. Applied and Ph.D. programs are offered in the areas of Agricultural Sciences, Biological Sciences, Bioresource Engineering, Biotechnology, Environmental Sciences, Food Science, and Nutritional Sciences. The Faculty offers some Graduate Certificates and Diplomas. The Faculty also offers some post-baccalaureate certificates: Certificate in Ecological Agriculture, Certificate in Food Science and Diploma in the Environment.

Coat of arms 

The Macdonald Campus coat of arms honours Sir William Macdonald, the major benefactor of McGill's agricultural college:

The colour of the field (gold) and the arm holding a cross (red) are from the second quarter of the arms of Sir William Macdonald, the tobacco manufacturer and philanthropist, who founded the College. His armorial bearings derived from the fact that he was a grandson of John, eighth Macdonald of Glenaladale. Until the 1930s, Macdonald College used Sir William's achievement as one quarter of the College arms. The two red martlets and the open book with its motto are from the arms of McGill University. The clover leaves (also gold) signify fertility and their three segments suggest the three purposes of the Campus, i.e. agriculture, service and food.

See also 
 Canadian Aviation Heritage Centre
 J. S. Marshall Radar Observatory
 List of agricultural universities and colleges
 Morgan Arboretum

References

External links 

 Official website
 Macdonald Campus Students' Society
 Macdonald Campus Graduate Students' Society
 Macdonald Department of Bioresource Engineering 
 Macdonald High School (at the western end of the campus and opened the same year)

Agricultural universities and colleges in Canada
Government colleges in Quebec
McGill University
Satellite campuses
Sainte-Anne-de-Bellevue, Quebec